A Multitrack Turing machine is a specific type of multi-tape Turing machine. 

In a standard n-tape Turing machine, n heads move independently along n tracks. In a n-track Turing machine, one head reads and writes on all tracks simultaneously. A tape position in a n-track Turing Machine contains n symbols from the tape alphabet. It is equivalent to the standard Turing machine and therefore accepts precisely the recursively enumerable languages.

Formal definition 
A multitrack Turing machine with -tapes can be formally defined as a 6-tuple , where

  is a finite set of states;
  is a finite set of input symbols, that is, the set of symbols allowed to appear in the initial tape contents;
 is a finite set of tape alphabet symbols;
  is the initial state;
  is the set of final or accepting states;
  is a partial function called the transition function.

A non-deterministic variant can be defined by replacing the transition function  by a transition relation .

Proof of equivalency to standard Turing machine
This will prove that a two-track Turing machine is equivalent to a standard Turing machine. This can be generalized to a n-track Turing machine. Let L be a recursively enumerable language. Let M=  be standard Turing machine that accepts L. Let M' is a two-track Turing machine. To prove M=M' it must be shown that M  M' and M'  M

If the second track is ignored then M and M' are clearly equivalent. 

The tape alphabet of a one-track Turing machine equivalent to a two-track Turing machine consists of an ordered pair. The input symbol a of a Turing machine M' can be identified as an ordered pair [x,y] of Turing machine M. The one-track Turing machine is:

M=  with the transition function 

This machine also accepts L.

References 

Thomas A. Sudkamp (2006). Languages and Machines, Third edition. Addison-Wesley. . Chapter 8.6: Multitape Machines: pp 269–271

Turing machine